COIN or COINS may refer to:

 Coin (band) (often stylized COIN), an American indie pop band
 Coinbase (Nasdaq: COIN), a company which operates a cryptocurrency exchange
 Collaborative innovation network, innovative teams 
 Community of interest network
 Combined Online Information System, a UK database containing HM Treasury's analysis of departmental spending
 ContextObjects in Spans (COinS), a specification for publishing OpenURL references in HTML
 Counter-insurgency
 Counter-insurgency aircraft

See also
 COIN-OR, the Computational Infrastructure for Operations Research project
 Coin (disambiguation)